The 2007 Milwaukee Brewers season marked the 25th anniversary of the Milwaukee Brewers winning the American League Championship and the 50th anniversary of the Milwaukee Braves winning the World Series. During the offseason, the Brewers re-signed free agents Bill Hall and Chris Capuano. The Brewers were also able to sign starting pitcher Jeff Suppan, second-baseman Craig Counsell, and third baseman Tony Graffanino from free agency.

The Brewers finished in second place in the National League Central with a record of 83–79, achieving their first winning record since 1992.

Offseason
The Brewers headed into the season celebrating the 25th anniversary of their American League Championship. They prepared for the season by hosting reunions and premiering a video of the 1982 team at the Pabst Theater. The Brewers announced they would celebrate the 1982 team on "Retro Fridays" by having fan give-aways relating to the pennant-winning team. Milwaukee also celebrated the 50th anniversary of the 1957 Milwaukee Braves victory in the World Series.

During the offseason, the Milwaukee Brewers increased their payroll from $54.5 million to $68 million, a significant amount for a small-market team.  The Brewers re-signed arbitration-eligible pitcher Chris Capuano, whose salary increased from $450,000 to $3.25 million, and arbitration-eligible Bill Hall, who signed a four-year, $24 million contract, largest on the team.  Both were members of the Brewers team in 2006.  The Brewers were able to acquire free agent starting pitcher Jeff Suppan from the St. Louis Cardinals by signing him to a four-year, $42 million deal. They also signed second-baseman Craig Counsell of the Arizona Diamondbacks and third-baseman Tony Graffanino of the Kansas City Royals off of free agency.

Notable offseason transactions
 March 26, 2007: Brady Clark and cash were traded by the Brewers to the Los Angeles Dodgers for Elmer Dessens.

Regular season

Season summary

Strong start of the season

The Brewers 2007 season began with a 7-1 victory on opening day over the Los Angeles Dodgers behind a complete game two-hitter by starting-pitcher Ben Sheets, becoming the first Brewer pitcher to throw a complete game on opening day since 1979. The Brewers would win their next game before dropping three in a row, including one to the Dodgers and the first two games of a three-game series with the Chicago Cubs. With a record of .500 after the first homestand of the season, the Brewers went on the road to win two games of a three-game set with the Florida Marlins. Continuing their road trip, the Brewers split games against the Cardinals after the first game of the series was postponed due to rain. After splitting games with the Cincinnati Reds, the Brewers moved into first place in the NL Central. The Brewers returned to Miller Park to win four of their next five games, sweeping the Pittsburgh Pirates and winning twice against the Houston Astros.

The Brewers played on the road for their next six games, winning two of three games against both the Cubs and Astros. The Brewers finished the month of April with a win against the Cardinals, in which Brewers starting pitcher Jeff Suppan pitched a complete game. During this game all players wore a special black "32" patch on their left arms to commemorate recently deceased Cardinals pitcher Josh Hancock.  Suppan's win gave him four on the season, tying him with Chris Capuano for the team lead after April. Brewers closer Francisco Cordero recorded a franchise record and league-leading ten saves in the month of April. Cordero finished April without allowing an earned run in twelve appearances. The Brewers ended the month with a  game lead in the NL Central.

The Brewers started May by completing a three-game sweep of the Cardinals and improved to an MLB-leading 18–9 record. The Brewers went on to win six of their next seven games; they won three of four against the Pirates and swept a three-game series with the Washington Nationals.

Early-season slump
The Brewers hit a slump when they went on an east coast trip to face the New York Mets and the Philadelphia Phillies, posting a 2-5 record. The Brewers returned home to face their interleague rivals, the Minnesota Twins. The Brewers won the last of a three-game series, a game which saw Geoff Jenkins hit his 200th home run. The Brewers then traveled to California for a six-game road-trip. They lost two of three from the Dodgers and were swept by the San Diego Padres. On May 24 during the San Diego Padres series, the Brewers called up Ryan Braun from the minor league Nashville Sounds. Braun became the Brewers starting third-baseman was placed in the third batting spot, ahead of Prince Fielder.

The Brewers returned home to start a ten-game home-stand, winning two of four games against the Atlanta Braves. At the end of May, first baseman Prince Fielder was voted the National League's Player of the Month. Fielder led the league in home runs with 19 and recorded a .755 on-base percentage and a .321 batting average. The Brewers played the Florida Marlins to continue their home-stand. They won two of three games to give the Brewers their first series victory since May 9. The win gave the Brewers a  lead in the NL Central. The Brewers finished their home-stand losing two of three games to the Chicago Cubs.

The Brewers started a nine-game interleague road trip with a series against the Texas Rangers. The Brewers lost the first two games against the struggling Rangers. In the second game of the series, former Ranger Francisco Cordero recorded his first blown save of the year. Before the game, Cordero held a 0.36 earned run average and an MLB-leading 22 saves. The following day, Cordero gave up his second blown save after the Rangers tied the game in the ninth inning. The Brewers would eventually win the game, snapping their seven-game losing streak after a Geoff Jenkins home run in the twelfth inning. On June 12, Justin Verlander of the Detroit Tigers pitched a no-hitter against the Brewers. The no-hitter was the first for the Tigers since 1984. The loss was the Brewers 20th in their past 30 games.

June turn-around
Following the no-hitter, the Brewers recorded eleven hits and defeated the Tigers in a comeback win. The following day, the Brewers defeated the Tigers to win the series. The Brewers traveled to Minnesota to face the rival Twins. In the first game, the Brewers recorded fifteen hits with an 11–3 win. In the three games following the no hitter, the Brewers recorded 39 hits and 20 runs. The Brewers were victorious in two of three games against the Twins.

After their road-stint, the Brewers came home for their next nine games. After starting-pitcher Chris Capuano was placed on the disabled-list, the Brewers called up Yovani Gallardo from the minor leagues. Gallardo pitched  innings, allowing three runs, and hit an RBI double in front of a sell-out crowd to give the Brewers their fifth win in six games against the San Francisco Giants. The following day the Brewers clinched their third straight series victory, with Ben Sheets pitching his second complete game of the year. The Brewers would go on to sweep the Giants and win two of three games from the Kansas City Royals. The Brewers would follow with another series sweep against the Houston Astros, winning the third game of the series in part because of an 11th-inning walk-off home run by back-up catcher Damian Miller. The Brewers were 8–1 on the home-stand.

Pre-break road trip
After their successful home stand, the Brewers went on the road for three series before the All-Star break. The Brewers defeated the second place Cubs in one of three games. During the series it was announced that Prince Fielder, Ben Sheets, J. J. Hardy and Francisco Cordero would be attending the 2007 Major League Baseball All-Star Game. This would be the first time four Brewer representatives have attended since 1983, when the Brewers were in the American League and the all-star team was managed by Milwaukee skipper Harvey Kuenn.

At the end of June Ben Sheets was named pitcher of the month and Ryan Braun the rookie of the month. Sheets was 5–0 with a 2.16 ERA in six starts, and Braun recorded a .382 average with six home runs, 21 RBI, a .716 slugging percentage.

Following their series in Chicago, the Brewers traveled to Pittsburgh to face the fourth-place Pirates. The Brewers won the first game of a four-game series. In the game Damian Miller hit a franchise tying seven RBIs and a grand slam in his first start after his walk-off home run at Miller Park. The Brewers then won one of three games against the Nationals and ended up 3–7 on the road trip.

Dog days of summer
The Brewers went into the All-Star break 10 games above .500, and a  game lead on the Cubs.  The Brewers then had 18 games scheduled in a 17-day period.  The Brewers started the stretch with a 6–4 homestand, but then went on to lose 6 of 8 on the road.  With their first off day in  weeks, the Brewers record stood at 57-48, but the Cubs had moved to within a game and a half of the division lead.  Then, on the final day of July, the Brewers were able to defeat the Mets in a 13 inning game, due to a Geoff Jenkins walk-off home run.  After the game, Rickie Weeks was sent down to AAA Nashville.  For the first time in over a hundred days, the division lead did not belong to the Brewers.

The Brewers frustrations continued in August, resulting in a dugout altercation during a loss to the Mets between Johnny Estrada and manager Ned Yost on August 2, 2007. Later, on August 8, infielder Tony Graffanino tore his ACL in a 19–4 loss to the Colorado Rockies, resulting in his loss for the season. The Brewers then called up Weeks to take his place on the roster.

In August Brewers first baseman Prince Fielder was suspended 3 games for arguing with the home plate umpire Wally Bell.

On August 29, the Brewers slipped into 3rd place, behind the Chicago Cubs and St. Louis Cardinals and were one game below .500 for the first time since April 6.

The race to October
Despite tumbling in August the Brewers started September on a high note to be tied with the Chicago Cubs for first place in the division.  For the first time in over 15 years in Brewers history a coin toss was held to decide homefield advantage should the Cardinals, Cubs and Brewers tie for the division. One coin toss decided that the Brewers would host St. Louis, while the other decided that the Brewers would travel to Chicago for any one game playoff that may be needed.

On September 9, the Brewers became the first road team in history to open a game by hitting three consecutive home runs. The win, solidified by a Cubs loss gives the Brewers a one-game lead in the division. However, the Brewers failed to either win the division or make the playoffs.

Season standings

National League Central

Record vs. opponents

Notable transactions
 August 9, 2007: Elmer Dessens was released by the Brewers.

Roster

Game log

|- style="background-color:#bbffbb"
| 1 || April 2 || Dodgers || 7–1 || Sheets (1-0) || Lowe (0-1) || || 45,341 || 1-0
|- style="background-color:#bbffbb"
| 2 || April 3 || Dodgers || 4–3 || Shouse (1-0) || Wolf (0-1) || Cordero (1) || 22,603 || 2-0
|- style="background-color:#ffbbbb"
| 3 || April 4 || Dodgers || 5–4 || Schmidt (1-0) || Suppan (0-1) || Saito (1) || 23,649 || 2-1
|- style="background-color:#ffbbbb"
| 4 || April 6 || Cubs || 9–3 || Hill (1-0) || Bush (0-1) || || 41,758 || 2-2
|- style="background-color:#ffbbbb"
| 5 || April 7 || Cubs || 6–3 || Zambrano (1-1) || Sheets (1-1) || Dempster (2) || 41,282 || 2-3
|- style="background-color:#bbffbb"
| 6 || April 8 || Cubs || 9–4 || Capuano (1-0) || Miller (0-1) || || 28,019 || 3-3
|- style="background-color:#ffbbbb"
| 7 || April 9 || @ Marlins || 5–3 || Sánchez (1-0) || Suppan (0-2) || Owens (1) || 11,157 || 3-4
|- style="background-color:#bbffbb"
| 8 || April 10 || @ Marlins || 3–2*  || Dessens (1-0) || Pinto (0-1) || Cordero (2) || 10,883 || 4-4
|- style="background-color:#bbffbb"
| 9 || April 11 || @ Marlins || 5–2 || Bush (1-1) || Mitre (0-2) || Cordero (3) || 11,379 || 5-4
|- style="background-color:#bbbbbb"
| -- || April 13 || @ Cardinals || colspan=5|Postponed (rain)  || 5-4
|- style="background-color:#bbffbb"
| 10 || April 14 || @ Cardinals || 3–2 || Suppan (1-1)|| Wells (1-2)|| Cordero (4) || 42,805 || 6-4
|- style="background-color:#ffbbbb"
| 11 || April 15 || @ Cardinals || 10–2 || Looper (2-1) || Sheets (1-2) || || 44,153 || 6-5
|- style="background-color:#bbffbb"
| 12 || April 16 || @ Reds || 10–6 || Capuano (2-0) || Milton (0-2) || || 12,521 || 7-5
|- style="background-color:#ffbbbb"
| 13 || April 17 || @ Reds || 11–5 || Stanton (1-0) || Shouse (1-1) || || 14,492 || 7-6
|- style="background-color:#bbffbb"
| 14 || April 18 || Pirates || 7–3 || Vargas (1-0) || Maholm (0-2) || || 22,331 || 8-6
|- style="background-color:#bbffbb"
| 15 || April 19 || Pirates || 7–5 || Suppan (2-2) || Duke (1-2) || Cordero (5) || 17,386 || 9-6
|- style="background-color:#ffbbbb"
| 16 || April 20 || Astros || 6–5 || White (1-0) || Wise (0-1) || Qualls (1) || 41,522 || 9-7
|- style="background-color:#bbffbb"
| 17 || April 21 || Astros || 6–4 || Capuano (3-0) || Rodríguez (0-2) || Cordero (6) || 41,209 || 10-7
|- style="background-color:#bbffbb"
| 18 || April 22 || Astros || 4–3 || Bush (2-1) || Oswalt (3-1) || Cordero (7) || 31,985 || 11-7
|- style="background-color:#bbffbb"
| 19 || April 23 || @ Cubs || 5–4  || Villanueva (1-0)  || Cherry (0-1)  || Turnbow (1) ||  33,920 || 12-7
|- style="background-color:#bbffbb"
| 20 || April 24 || @ Cubs || 4–1 || Suppan (2-2) || Hill (3-1) || Cordero (8) || 34,382 || 13-7
|- style="background-color:#ffbbbb"
| 21 || April 25 || @ Cubs || 9–3  || Lilly (2-2) || Dessens (1-1)|| || 38,581 || 13-8
|- style="background-color:#bbffbb"
| 22 || April 27 || @ Astros || 4–1 || Capuano (4-0) || Oswalt (3-2) || Cordero (9) || 40,530 || 14-8
|- style="background-color:#ffbbbb"
| 23 || April 28 || @ Astros || 10–1 || Sampson (3-1) || Bush (2-2) || || 41,004 || 14-9
|- style="background-color:#bbffbb"
| 24 || April 29 || @ Astros || 3–1 || Vargas (2-0) || Williams (0-4) || Cordero (10) || 37,114 || 15-9
|- style="background-color:#bbffbb"
| 25 || April 30 || Cardinals || 7–1 || Suppan (4-2) || Wells (1-5) || || 20,191 || 16-9
|-
| colspan=9 | *Game suspended, completed April 11

|- style="background-color:#bbffbb"
| 26 || May 1 || Cardinals || 12–2 || Sheets (2-2) || Looper (3-2) ||  || 20,446 || 17–9
|- style="background-color:#bbffbb"
| 27 || May 2 || Cardinals || 4–0 || Villanueva (2-0) || Reyes (0-5) || || 23,299 || 18–9
|- style="background-color:#ffbbbb"
| 28 || May 3 || Pirates || 4–2 || Gorzelanny (4-0) || Bush (2-3) || Torres (9) || 15,602 || 18-10
|- style="background-color:#bbffbb"
| 29 || May 4 || Pirates || 10–0 || Vargas (3-0) || Maholm (1-4) || || 40,190 || 19-10
|- style="background-color:#bbffbb"
| 30 || May 5 || Pirates || 6–3 || Suppan (5-2) || Duke (1-3) || Cordero (11) || 40,361 || 20-10
|- style="background-color:#bbffbb"
| 31 || May 6 || Pirates || 6–4 || Villanueva (3-0) || Grabow (0-1) || Cordero (12) || 37,761 || 21-10
|- style="background-color:#bbffbb"
| 32 || May 7 || Nationals || 3–0 || Capuano (5-0) || Chico (2-4) || Cordero (13) || 17,751 || 22-10
|- style="background-color:#bbffbb"
| 33 || May 8 || Nationals || 6–4 || Bush (3-3) || Simontacchi (0-1) || Cordero (14) || 19,398 || 23-10
|- style="background-color:#bbffbb"
| 34 || May 9 || Nationals || 3–1 || Turnbow (1-0) || Bowie (0-2) || Cordero (15) || 24,658 || 24-10
|- style="background-color:#ffbbbb"
| 35 || May 11 || @ Mets || 5–4 || Sosa (2-0) || Suppan (5-3) || Wagner (9) || 40,126 ||  24-11
|- style="background-color:#bbffbb"
| 36 || May 12 || @ Mets || 12–3 || Sheets (3-2) || Pelfrey (0-5) || ||| 50,193 || 25-11
|- style="background-color:#ffbbbb"
| 37 || May 13 || @ Mets || 9–1 || Pérez (4-3)||Capuano (5-1) || ||| 51,427 || 25-12
|- style="background-color:#ffbbbb"
| 38 || May 14 || @ Phillies || 8–6 || Condrey (1-0) || Turnbow (1-1) || Myers (4) || 29,183 || 25-13
|- style="background-color:#ffbbbb"
| 39 || May 15 || @ Phillies || 4–3 || Myers (1-2) || Turnbow (1-2) || || 41,258 || 25-14
|- style="background-color:#ffbbbb"
| 40 || May 16 || @ Phillies || 6–2 || Hamels (6-1) || Suppan (5-4) || || 42,713 || 25-15
|- style="background-color:#bbffbb"
| 41 || May 17 || @ Phillies || 3–2 || Sheets (4-2) || García (1-3) || Cordero (16) || 31,553 || 26-15
|- style="background-color:#ffbbbb"
| 42 || May 18 || Twins || 8–1 || Bonser (2-1) || Capuano (5-2) || || 44,759 || 26-16
|- style="background-color:#ffbbbb"
| 43 || May 19 || Twins || 5–2 || Baker (1-0) || Bush (3-4) || || 44,427 || 26-17
|- style="background-color:#bbffbb"
| 44 || May 20 || Twins || 6–5 || Wise (1-1) || Reyes (0-1) || Cordero (17) || 39,119 || 27-17
|- style="background-color:#bbffbb"
| 45 || May 21 || @ Dodgers || 9–5 || Suppan (6-4) || Tomko (1-5) || || 33,446 || 28-17
|- style="background-color:#ffbbbb"
| 46 || May 22 || @ Dodgers || 3–2 || Wolf (6-3) || Sheets (4-3) || Saito (14) || 33,552 || 28-18
|- style="background-color:#ffbbbb"
| 47 || May 23 || @ Dodgers || 5–1 || Penny (6-1) || Capuano (5-3) || || 35,609 || 28-19
|- style="background-color:#ffbbbb"
| 48 || May 25 || @ Padres || 8–6 || Maddux (4-3) || Bush (3-5) || Linebrink (1) || 32,130 || 28-20
|- style="background-color:#ffbbbb"
| 49 || May 26 || @ Padres || 6–3 || Germano (3-0) || Vargas (3-1) || Hoffman (14) || 35,975 || 28-21
|- style="background-color:#ffbbbb"
| 50 || May 27 || @ Padres || 3–0 || Peavy (7-1) || Suppan (6-5) || Hoffman (15) || 41,246 || 28-22
|- style="background-color:#ffbbbb"
| 51 || May 28 || Braves || 2–1 || James (5-4) || Capuano (5-4) || Wickman (8) || 41,139 || 28-23
|- style="background-color:#bbffbb"
| 52 || May 29 || Braves || 5–4 || Sheets (5-3) || Moylan (1-1)|| Cordero (18) || 27,559 || 29-23
|- style="background-color:#ffbbbb"
| 53 || May 30 || Braves || 9–3 || Hudson (6-3) || Turnbow (1-3) || || 32,758 || 29-24
|- style="background-color:#bbffbb"
| 54 || May 31 || Marlins || 4–3 || Villanueva (4-0) || Lindstrom (0-2) || Cordero (19) || 17,704 || 30-24

|- style="background-color:#bbffbb"
| 55 || June 1 ||  Marlins || 8–5 || Suppan (7-5) || Olsen (4–5) || Cordero (20) || 30,852 || 31-24
|- style="background-color:#ffbbbb"
| 56 || June 2 || Marlins || 5–2 || Lindstrom (1-2) || Capellán (0-1) || Gregg (7) || 42,250 || 31-25
|- style="background-color:#bbffbb"
| 57 || June 3 || Marlins || 3–0 || Sheets (6-3) || Willis (7-4) || Cordero (21) || 43,172 || 32-25
|- style="background-color:#ffbbbb"
| 58 || June 4 || Cubs || 7–2 || Mármol (1-0) || Bush (3-6) || || 35,760 || 33-25
|- style="background-color:#bbffbb"
| 59 || June 5 || Cubs || 7–5 || Vargas (4-1) || Lilly (4-4) || Cordero (22) || 38,535 || 33-26
|- style="background-color:#ffbbbb"
| 60 || June 6 || Cubs || 6–2 || Zambrano (6-5) || Suppan (7-6) || || 40,186 || 33-27
|- style="background-color:#ffbbbb"
| 61 || June 8 || @ Rangers || 9–6 || Tejeda (5-6) || Capuano (5-5) || Gagné (6) || 29,562 || 33-28
|- style="background-color:#ffbbbb"
| 62 || June 9 || @ Rangers || 4–3 || Francisco (1-0) || Cordero (0-1) || || 37,882 || 33-29
|- style="background-color:#bbffbb"
| 63 || June 10 || @ Rangers || 9–6  || Villanueva (5-0) || Eyre (2-3) || Vargas (1) || 24,129 || 34-29
|- style="background-color:#ffbbbb"
| 64 || June 12 || @ Tigers || 4–0 || Verlander (6-2) || Suppan (7-7) || || 33,555 || 34-30
|- style="background-color:#bbffbb"
| 65 || June 13 || @ Tigers || 3–2 || Spurling (1-0) || Rodney (1-5) || Cordero (23) || 37,593 || 35-30
|- style="background-color:#bbffbb"
| 66 || June 14 || @ Tigers || 6–5 || Sheets (7-3) || Durbin (5-3) || Cordero (24) || 41,390 || 36-30
|- style="background-color:#bbffbb"
| 67 || June 15 || @ Twins || 11–3 || Vargas (5-1) || Baker (1-2) || Shouse (1) || 27,977 || 37-30
|- style="background-color:#bbffbb"
| 68 || June 16 || @ Twins || 5–2 || Bush (4-6) || Bonser (5-3) || Cordero (25) || 37,117 || 38-30
|- style="background-color:#ffbbbb"
| 69 || June 17 || @ Twins || 10–9 || Nathan (3-1) || Spurling (1-1) || || 31,624 || 38-31
|- style="background-color:#bbffbb"
| 70 || June 18 || Giants || 5–4 || Gallardo (1-0) || Lowry (6-6) || Cordero (26) || 41,631 || 39-31
|- style="background-color:#bbffbb"
| 71 || June 19 || Giants || 6–2 || Sheets (8-3) || Lincecum (2-2) || || 35,238 || 40-31
|- style="background-color:#bbffbb"
| 72 || June 20 || Giants || 7–5 || Vargas (6-1) || Zito (6-8)|| Cordero (27) || 35,151 || 41-31
|- style="background-color:#bbffbb"
| 73 || June 22 || Royals || 11–6 || Suppan (8-7) || de la Rosa (4-9) || || 36,328 || 42-31
|- style="background-color:#bbffbb"
| 74 || June 23 || Royals || 7–1 || Bush (5-6) || Bannister (4-4) || || 41,721 || 43-31
|- style="background-color:#ffbbbb"
| 75 || June 24 || Royals || 4–3  || Riske (1-2) || Capellán (0-2) || Gobble (1) || 44,064 || 43-32
|- style="background-color:#bbffbb"
| 76 || June 25 || Astros || 5–1 || Sheets (9-3) || Jennings (1-2) || || 28,786 || 44-32
|- style="background-color:#bbffbb"
| 77 || June 26 || Astros || 11–5 || Wise (2-1) || Rodríguez (4-7) || || 30,713 || 45-32
|- style="background-color:#bbffbb"
| 78 || June 27 || Astros || 6–3  || Bush (6-6) || Borkowski (1-3) || || 31,862 || 46-32
|- style="background-color:#ffbbbb"
| 79 || June 29 || @ Cubs || 6–5 || Howry (5-4) || Cordero (0-2) || || 41,909 || 46-33
|- style="background-color:#bbffbb"
| 80 || June 30 || @ Cubs || 13–4 || Sheets (10-3) || Marshall (4-3) || || 41,415 || 47-33

|- style="background-color:#ffbbbb"
| 81 || July 1 || @ Cubs || 5–1 || Marquis (6-4) || Bush (6-7) || || 41,486 || 47-34
|- style="background-color:#bbffbb"
| 82 || July 2 || @ Pirates || 10–3 || Villanueva (6-0) || Kuwata (0-1) || || 14,455 || 48-34
|- style="background-color:#ffbbbb"
| 83 || July 3 || @ Pirates || 6–2 || Youman (1-0) || Gallardo (1-1) || || 25,416 || 48-35
|- style="background-color:#ffbbbb"
| 84 || July 4 || @ Pirates || 5–3 || Snell (7-5) || Vargas (6-2) || Capps (8) || 35,878 || 48-36
|- style="background-color:#ffbbbb"
| 85 || July 5 || @ Pirates || 6–3 || Gorzelanny (9-4) || Sheets (10-4) || Capps (9) || 15,134 || 48-37
|- style="background-color:#bbffbb"
| 86 || July 6 || @ Nationals || 6–2 || Bush (7-7) || Bacsik (2-6) || || 18,961 || 49-37
|- style="background-color:#ffbbbb"
| 87 || July 7 || @ Nationals || 5–4 || Simontacchi (6-6) || Suppan (8-8) || C. Cordero (15) || 24,774 || 49-38
|- style="background-color:#ffbbbb"
| 88 || July 8 || @ Nationals || 7–2 || Redding (1-1) || Capuano (5-6) || || 20,637 || 49-39
|- style="background-color:#ffbbbb"
| 89 || July 13 || Rockies ||  10–6 || Francis (9-5) || Villanueva (6-1) || || 37,690 || 49-40
|- style="background-color:#bbffbb"
| 90 || July 14 || Rockies || 2–1  || Turnbow (2-3) || Hawkins (0-4) || || 42,559 || 50-40
|- style="background-color:#bbffbb"
| 91 || July 15 || Rockies || 4–3 || Wise (3-1) || Affeldt (4-2) || Cordero (28) || 42,754 || 51-40
|- style="background-color:#bbffbb"
| 92 || July 16 || Diamondbacks || 4–3 || Bush (8-7) || Owings (5-5) || Cordero (29) || 36,381 || 52-40
|- style="background-color:#bbffbb"
| 93 || July 17 || Diamondbacks || 3–2 || Vargas (7-2) || Petit (1-2) || Cordero (30) || 32,540 || 53-40
|- style="background-color:#ffbbbb"
| 94 || July 18 || Diamondbacks || 5–2 || Peña (4-2) || Balfour (0-1) || Valverde (28) || 30,247 || 53-41
|- style="background-color:#bbffbb"
| 95 || July 19 || Diamondbacks || 10–1 || Gallardo (2-1) || Hernández (5-6) || Wise (1) || 41,156 || 54-41
|- style="background-color:#ffbbbb"
| 96 || July 20 || Giants || 8–4 || Lowry (10-7) || Villanueva (6-2) || || 43,121 || 54-42
|- style="background-color:#ffbbbb"
| 97 || July 21 || Giants || 8–0 || Lincecum (5-2) || Bush (8-8) || || 43,180 || 54-43
|- style="background-color:#bbffbb"
| 98 || July 22 || Giants || 7–5 || Vargas (8-2) || Zito (7-10) || Cordero (31) || 42,554 || 55-43
|- style="background-color:#ffbbbb"
| 99 || July 23 || @ Reds || 2–1  || Burton (1-1) || Balfour (0-2) || || 23,489 || 55-44
|- style="background-color:#bbffbb"
| 100 || July 24 || @ Reds || 5–3 || Gallardo (3-1) || Belisle (5-7) || Cordero (32) || 18,284 || 56-44
|- style="background-color:#ffbbbb"
| 101 || July 25 || @ Reds || 7–3 || Lohse (6-12) || Suppan (8-9) || Weathers (20) || 30,976 || 56-45
|- style="background-color:#ffbbbb"
| 102 || July 26 || @ Reds || 6–5  || Burton (2-1) || Cordero (0-3) || || 24,170 || 56-46
|- style="background-color:#bbffbb"
| 103 || July 27 || @ Cardinals || 12–2 || Vargas (9-2) || Maroth (0-4) || || 45,137 || 57-46
|- style="background-color:#ffbbbb"
| 104 || July 28 || @ Cardinals || 7–6 || Springer (5-1) || Cordero (0-4) || || 45,089 || 57-47
|- style="background-color:#ffbbbb"
| 105 || July 28 || @ Cardinals || 5–2 || Reyes (1-10) || Capuano (5-7) || Isringhausen (20) || 45,829 || 57-48
|- style="background-color:#ffbbbb"
| 106 || July 29 || @ Cardinals || 9–5 ||Franklin (4-0) || Turnbow (2-4) || || 44,854 || 57-49
|- style="background-color:#bbffbb"
| 107 || July 31 || Mets || 4–2 || Bush (9-8) || Sele (3-1) || || 41,790 || 58-49

|- style="background-color:#ffbbbb"
| 108 || August 1 || Mets || 8–5 || Pérez (10-7) || Vargas (9-3) || Wagner (25) || 42,058 || 58-50
|- style="background-color:#ffbbbb"
| 109 || August 2 || Mets || 12–4 || Lawrence (1-0) || Capuano (5-8) || || 41,704 || 58-51
|- style="background-color:#bbffbb"
| 110 || August 3 || Phillies || 2–1 || Gallardo (4-1) || Kendrick (5-2) || Cordero (33) || 39,483 || 59-51
|- style="background-color:#bbffbb"
| 111 || August 4 || Phillies || 6–5 || Turnbow (3-4) || Gordon (1-2) || Cordero (34) || 42,126 || 60-51
|- style="background-color:#ffbbbb"
| 112 || August 5 || Phillies || 8–6  || Myers (2-3) || Parra (0-1) || Mesa (1) || 43,716 || 60-52
|- style="background-color:#ffbbbb"
| 113 || August 6 || @ Rockies || 6–2 || Fogg (6-7) || Vargas (9-4) || || 29,555 || 60-53
|- style="background-color:#ffbbbb"
| 114 || August 7 || @ Rockies || 11–4 || Hirsh (5-7) || Capuano (5-9) || || 30,280 || 60-54
|- style="background-color:#ffbbbb"
| 115 || August 8 || @ Rockies || 19–4 || Francis (13-5) || Gallardo (4-2) || || 26,613 || 60-55
|- style="background-color:#bbffbb"
| 116 || August 10 || @ Astros || 5–4  || Spurling (2-1) || Moehler (1-4) || Cordero (35) || 40,211 || 61-55
|- style="background-color:#bbffbb"
| 117 || August 11 || @ Astros || 7–4 || Linebrink (4-3) || Lidge (3-2) || Cordero (36) || 41,461 || 62-55
|- style="background-color:#ffbbbb"
| 118 || August 12 || @ Astros || 6–4 || McLemore (2-0) || Villanueva (6-3) || Lidge (8) || 43,578 || 62-56
|- style="background-color:#ffbbbb"
| 119 || August 14 || Cardinals || 12–4 || Wells (6-13) || Capuano (5-10) || || 37,518 || 62-57
|- style="background-color:#ffbbbb"
| 120 || August 15 || Cardinals || 8–3 || Piñeiro (3-2) || Gallardo (4-3) || || 33,404 || 62-58
|- style="background-color:#ffbbbb"
| 121 || August 16 || Cardinals || 8–0 || Wainwright (11-9) || Bush (9-9) || || 36,062 || 62-59
|- style="background-color:#ffbbbb"
| 122 || August 17 || Reds || 8–3 || Arroyo (6-13) || Suppan (8-10) || || 41,008 || 62-60
|- style="background-color:#bbffbb"
| 123 || August 18 || Reds || 8–4 || Vargas (10-4) || Ramírez (0-1) || || 43,087 || 63-60
|- style="background-color:#ffbbbb"
| 124 || August 19 || Reds || 7–6 || Bray (2-0) || Linebrink (4-4) || Weathers (25) || 42,398 || 63-61
|- style="background-color:#bbffbb"
| 125 || August 20 || @ Diamondbacks || 9–0 || Gallardo (5-3) || Davis (10-11) || Villanueva (1) || 26,900 || 64-61
|- style="background-color:#bbffbb"
| 126 || August 21 || @ Diamondbacks || 7–4 || Bush (10-9) || Hernández (9-8) || Cordero (37) || 27,784 || 65-61
|- style="background-color:#ffbbbb"
| 127 || August 22 || @ Diamondbacks || 3–2 || Webb (14-8) || Suppan (8-11) || Valverde (37) || 31,720 || 65-62
|- style="background-color:#ffbbbb"
| 128 || August 24 || @ Giants || 11–6 || Lowry (14-5) || Capuano (5-11) || || 37,583 || 65-63
|- style="background-color:#ffbbbb"
| 129 || August 25 || @ Giants || 6–2 || Correia (2-6) || Gallardo (5-4) || Wilson (2) || 39,069 || 65-64
|- style="background-color:#ffbbbb"
| 130 || August 26 || @ Giants || 5–4 || Kline (1-2) || Linebrink (4-5) || Hennessey (14) || 40,997 || 65-65
|- style="background-color:#ffbbbb"
| 131 || August 28 || @ Cubs || 5–3 || Hill (8-7) || Linebrink (4-6)  || Dempster (22) || 40,884 || 65-66
|- style="background-color:#bbffbb"
| 132 || August 29 || @ Cubs || 6–1 || Sheets (11-4) || Zambrano (14-11) || || 40,512 || 66-66
|- style="background-color:#ffbbbb"
| 133 || August 30 || @ Cubs || 5–4 || Mármol (4-1) || Capuano (5-12) || Dempster (23) || 40,790 || 66-67
|- style="background-color:#bbffbb"
| 134 || August 31 || Pirates || 3–2 || Gallardo (6-4) || Armas (2-5) || Cordero (38) || 35,689 || 67-67

|- style="background-color:#bbffbb"
| 135 || September 1 || Pirates || 12–3 || Bush (11-9) || Youman (3-5) || || 34,190 || 68-67
|- style="background-color:#bbffbb"
| 136 || September 2 || Pirates || 7–4 || Suppan (9-11) || Osoria (0-1) || Cordero (39) || 39,339 || 69-67
|- style="background-color:#ffbbbb"
| 137 || September 3 || Astros || 9–7 || Borkowski (4-3) || Aquino (0-1) || Qualls (4) || 31,226 || 69-68
|- style="background-color:#bbffbb"
| 138 || September 4 || Astros || 5–3 || Villanueva (7-3) || Backe (0-1) || Cordero (40) || 25,854 || 70-68
|- style="background-color:#bbffbb"
| 139 || September 5 || Astros || 14–2 || Gallardo  (7-4) || Albers (4-7) || || 28,988 || 71-68
|- style="background-color:#ffbbbb"
| 140 || September 7 || @ Reds || 11–4 || Arroyo (8-14) || Bush (11-10) || || 21,006 || 71-69
|- style="background-color:#bbffbb"
| 141 || September 8 || @ Reds || 4–3 || Turnbow (4-4) || Weathers (2-5) || Cordero (41) || 22,758 || 72-69
|- style="background-color:#bbffbb"
| 142 || September 9 || @ Reds || 10–5 || Sheets (12-4) || Dumatrait (0-4) || || 21,534 || 73-69
|- style="background-color:#ffbbbb"
| 143 || September 10 || @ Pirates || 9–0 || Armas (4-5) || Villanueva (7-4) || || 13,683 || 73-70
|- style="background-color:#bbffbb"
| 144 || September 11 || @ Pirates || 6–1 || Gallardo (8-4) || Bullington (0-2) || || 11,962 || 74-70
|- style="background-color:#ffbbbb"
| 145 || September 12 || @ Pirates || 7–4 || Grabow (3-1) || Turnbow (4-5) || Capps (16) || 10,566 || 74-71
|- style="background-color:#ffbbbb"
| 146 || September 14 || Reds || 6–5 || Shearn (3-0) || Sheets (12-5) || Bray (1) || 42,944 || 74-72
|- style="background-color:#bbffbb"
| 147 || September 15 || Reds || 5–3 || Suppan (10-11) || Saarloos (1-5) || Cordero (42) || 40,710 || 75-72
|- style="background-color:#bbffbb"
| 148 || September 16 || Reds || 5–2 || Villanueva (8-4) || Belisle (8-9) || Cordero (43) || 31,150 || 76-72
|- style="background-color:#bbffbb"
| 149 || September 17 || @ Astros || 6–0 || Gallardo (9-4) || Albers (4-9) || || 32,578 || 77-72
|- style="background-color:#bbffbb"
| 150 || September 18 || @ Astros || 9–1 || Vargas (11-4) || Paulino (0-1) || || 32,866 || 78-72
|- style="background-color:#ffbbbb"
| 151 || September 19 || @ Astros || 5–4  || Lidge (5-2) || Wise (3-2) || || 36,981 || 78-73
|- style="background-color:#ffbbbb"
| 152 || September 20 || @ Braves || 3–1 || Bennett (1-0) || Suppan (10-12) || Soriano (8) || 26,595 || 78-74
|- style="background-color:#bbffbb"
| 153 || September 21 || @ Braves || 4 -1 || Linebrink (5-6) || T. Hudson (16-9) || F. Cordero (44) || 34,401 || 79-74
|- style="background-color:#ffbbbb"
| 154 || September 22 || @ Braves || 4–3  || Devine (1-0) || McClung (0-1) || || 42,378 || 79-75
|- style="background-color:#ffbbbb"
| 155 || September 23 || @ Braves || 7–4 || Acosta (1-1) || Vargas (11-5) || Soriano (9) || 44,088 || 79-76
|- style="background-color:#bbffbb"
| 156 || September 24 || Cardinals || 13–5 || Bush (12-10) || Wainwright (13-12) || || 40,908 || 80-76
|- style="background-color:#bbffbb"
| 157 || September 25 || Cardinals || 9–1 || Suppan (11-12) || Looper (12-12) || || 32,329 || 81-76
|- style="background-color:#ffbbbb"
| 158 || September 26 || Cardinals || 7–3 || Thompson (8-6) || Villanueva (8-5) || || 32,411 || 81-77
|- style="background-color:#ffbbbb"
| 159 || September 27 || Padres || 9–5 || Thatcher (2-1) || Gallardo (9-5) || || 34,918 || 81-78
|- style="background-color:#ffbbbb"
| 160 || September 28 || Padres || 6–3 || Maddux (14-11) || Vargas (11-6) || Hoffman (42) || 38,135 || 81-79
|- style="background-color:#bbffbb"
| 161 || September 29 || Padres || 4–3  || Stetter (1-0) || Thatcher (2-2) || || 40,946 || 82-79
|- style="background-color:#bbffbb"
| 162 || September 30 || Padres || 11–6 || Suppan (12-12) || Tomko (4-12) || || 42,415 || 83-79

|-
|

Player stats

Batting

Starters by position
Note: Pos = Position; G = Games played; AB = At bats; H = Hits; Avg. = Batting average; HR = Home runs; RBI = Runs batted in

Other batters
Note: G = Games played; AB = At bats; H = Hits; Avg. = Batting average; HR = Home runs; RBI = Runs batted in

Pitching

Starting pitchers
Note: G = Games pitched; IP = Innings pitched; W = Wins; L = Losses; ERA = Earned run average; SO = Strikeouts

Other pitchers
Note: G = Games pitched; IP = Innings pitched; W = Wins; L = Losses; ERA = Earned run average; SO = Strikeouts

Relief pitchers
Note: G = Games pitched; W = Wins; L = Losses; SV = Saves; ERA = Earned run average; SO = Strikeouts

Farm system

The Brewers' farm system consisted of six minor league affiliates in 2007.

References

Game Logs:
1st Half: Milwaukee Brewers Game Log on ESPN.com
2nd Half: Milwaukee Brewers Game Log on ESPN.com
Batting Statistics: Milwaukee Brewers Batting Stats on ESPN.com
Pitching Statistics: Milwaukee Brewers Pitching Stats on ESPN.com
2007 Milwaukee Brewers at Baseball Reference

Milwaukee Brewers seasons
Milwaukee Brewers season
Milwaukee Brew